

Porl King (born 19 October 1967 on the Wirral Peninsula, United Kingdom) is a British musician.

He was the singer, songwriter and guitarist for the goth band Rosetta Stone from its inception in the late 1980s until its demise in 1998. Since disbanding Rosetta Stone in 1998, King has pursued a career in digital audio and Pro Tools production.
King has also worked with the French progressive act Mellow, for whom he has done remixes and the musical score created for the Roman Coppola art-house film CQ. He has also played with Liverpool band Mulu.

Miserylab
King began writing and recording his own material again late in 2005 under the guise of miserylab. On 17 July 2007, miserylab released The Vaporware EP, consisting of four tracks, through Myspace. 
King admits that miserylab has more of a political edge, driven by his frustration at the artificial horror imagery that clouded perceptions of goth music.

In Death It Ends
In recent years, King has worked on a project called In Death It Ends.

References

Gothic rock musicians
Living people
English male singers
People from the Metropolitan Borough of Wirral
1967 births